There have been two Finnish formations called IV Corps (IV Armeijakunta, IV AK):

 IV Corps during the Winter War
 IV Corps during the Continuation War